Carl Ernst Heinrich Schmidt ( – ), also known in Russia as Karl Genrikhovich Schmidt, was a Baltic German chemist from the Governorate of Livonia, a part of the Russian Empire.

Biography 
Schmidt received his PhD in 1844 from the University of Gießen under Justus von Liebig. In 1845, he first announced the presence in the test of some Ascidians of what he called "tunicine", a substance very similar to cellulose. Tunicine now is regarded as cellulose and correspondingly a remarkable substance to find in an animal.

In 1850, Schmidt had been named Professor of Pharmacy at Dorpat (Tartu) and in 1851 he was appointed Professor of Chemistry in the mathematical and physical division on the University of Dorpat. He was a corresponding member (1873) of the Saint Petersburg Academy of Sciences (today Russian Academy of Sciences). He was the president of the Estonian Naturalists' Society in 1894. Schmidt is notable as the PhD advisor of the Nobel Prize winner Wilhelm Ostwald.

Scientific work 
Schmidt determined the typical crystallization patterns of many important biochemicals such as uric acid, oxalic acid and its salts, lactic acid, cholesterin, stearin, etc. He analysed muscle fibre and chitin. He showed that animal and plant cell constituents are chemically similar and studied reactions of calcium albuminates. He studied alcoholic fermentation and the chemistry of metabolism and digestion. He discovered hydrochloric acid in gastric juice and its chemical interaction with pepsin. He studied bile and pancreatic juices. Some of this work was done with Friedrich Bidder. He studied chemical changes in blood associated with cholera, dysentery, diabetes, and arsenic poisoning.

References

Bibliography 

 
 
 
 
 
 
 
 

1822 births
1894 deaths
People from Jelgava
People from Courland Governorate
Baltic-German people
19th-century German chemists
Chemists from the Russian Empire
University of Giessen alumni
Academic staff of the University of Tartu
Corresponding members of the Saint Petersburg Academy of Sciences
Burials at Raadi cemetery
Members of the Göttingen Academy of Sciences and Humanities